Three Stations is a crime novel by Martin Cruz Smith set in Russia circa 2010. It is the seventh novel to feature Detective-Investigator Arkady Renko, published 29 years after the initial novel of the Renko series, Gorky Park.

Plot
The title refers to the three Moscow railway stations, Leningrad Station, Kazansky Station and Yaroslavl Station situated on Komsomolskaya Square, also often referred to as Three Stations Square.

A teenage mother arrives at Three Stations, but her baby is stolen.   The only person to help her is Zhenya, the young chess hustler who is a sometime ward of Arkady Renko, the police investigator.  Meanwhile, Arkady tries to prove that the overdose death of a young prostitute in the station is nothing of the sort, and is suspended for his trouble.   A billionaire casino owner with financial troubles offers to hire Arkady, but the latter can trust no-one.   Thugs, dwarves, ballerinas, Central Asians and a gang of homeless tweens complicate matters still further.

Quotes from Three Stations 

“It was not easy to be arrested for drunkenness. It was difficult to distinguish drunkenness from, say, sharing a bottle with friends, jolly times, sad times, saint’s day, women’s day, the urge to nap, the need to hold up a wall, the need to piss on the wall. It was hard to stand out as legitimately drunk when the bar was set so high.”

"At Three Stations the crippled, outcast and usually hidden members of society gathered like the Court of Miracles only without the miracles."

“Fumo ergo sum…”

“…death would make up for a lifetime of sleep deprivation.”

“…observant Jew who took seriously the Torah’s injunction against operating equipment during Shabbos….but he nodded off during a television documentary on Putin’s early years-Just Another Boy!-and awoke to a rebroadcast of the same show. He had seen the documentary six times so far. When Arkady turned off the set it was like cutting a man down from the rack.”

“Someone has to point out to the blockheads in the Kremlin that we have an angry mob; only this mob is made up of the rich. Peasants are hard to rouse, but the rich have expectations.”

References

External links
 Martin Cruz Smith official site

2010 American novels
Arkady Renko
Novels by Martin Cruz Smith
Novels set in Moscow
Simon & Schuster books